The LXXII Army Corps was an army corps of the German Wehrmacht during World War II. The corps was formed in February 1944. Before October 1944, it carried the designation z. b. V., marking it as a corps 'for special deployment'.

History 
The LXXII Army Corps z. b. V. was formed on 13 February 1944 in southern Russia. It was initially subordinate to the 6th Army (subordinate to Army Group A, later Army Group South Ukraine) in the Galați area in Moldavia. It was moved to the 3rd Romanian Army under Army Group South Ukraine in May 1944, but then transferred back to 6th Army in August, to the army group reserves in September, and once again to the 6th Army, now under Army Group South, in October.

Beginning in October 1944, the designation z. b. V. was dropped and the corps subsequently referred to as LXXII Army Corps.

In December 1944, the LXXII Army Corps was assigned to the 3rd Hungarian Army under Army Group South, before being transferred back to the 6th Army in January 1945. After subordination to the 8th Army between February and April 1945, it was transferred to the newly formed Army Group Ostmark. Under Army Group Ostmark, the LXXII Army Corps surrendered at the end of the war in May 1945.

Structure

Noteworthy individuals 

 Sigismund von Förster, corps commander of LXXII Army Corps z.b.V. (22 July 1943 – 25 September 1944).
 Georg Zwade, corps commander of LXXII Army Corps z.b.V. (25 September 1944 – October 1944).
 August Schmidt, corps commander of LXXII Army Corps z.b.V. and LXXII Army Corps (October 1944 – April 1945).
 Anton Grasser, corps commander of LXXII Army Corps (6. – 20. April  1945)
 Werner Schmidt-Hammer, corps commander of LXXII Army Corps (April 1945 – May 1945).

References 

Corps of Germany in World War II
Military units and formations established in 1944
Military units and formations disestablished in 1945